The 49th NAACP Image Awards ceremony, presented by the National Association for the Advancement of Colored People (NAACP), honored outstanding representations and achievements of people of color in motion pictures, television, music, and literature during the 2017 calendar year. The ceremony took place on January 15, 2018 at the Pasadena Civic Auditorium, was hosted by Anthony Anderson and broadcast on TV One.

During the ceremony american actor and film director Danny Glover was honored with the President's Award for being «a true inspiration who always uses his celebrity status to advance the cause of social justice and respect for our diverse society. [...] Glover has is known for wide-reaching community activism and philanthropic efforts with a particular emphasis on advocacy for economic justice, access to health care and education programs in the United States and Africa». William Lucy was honored with the «in recognition of his role in the labour movement and his accomplishments as a labor organizer and justice advocate. His work with Martin Luther King Jr. during the 1968 Memphis Sanitation Strike and the instrumental role he played in the Anti-Apartheid Movement».

The award show also honored with the Vanguard Award the surviving of 1968 Memphis Sanitation Strike "I Am a Man" workers for supporting the African-American community and the workers' struggle in the Southern United States to recognise equal pay and rights for the labour force.

All nominees are listed below, and the winners are listed in bold.

Special Awards

Motion Picture

Television

Documentary

Outstanding Documentary – (Film)
 STEP
 I Called Him Morgan
 The Rape of Recy Taylor
 Tell Them We Are Rising: The Story of Black Colleges and Universities
 Whose Streets?

Outstanding Documentary – (Television)
 The 44th President: In His Own Words
 Birth of a Movement
 Black Love
 The Defiant Ones
 What the Health

Animated/CGI

Outstanding Character Voice-Over Performance – (Television or Film)
 Tiffany Haddish – Legends of Chamberlain Heights
 Yvette Nicole Brown – Elena of Avalor
 Loretta Devine – Doc McStuffins
 David Oyelowo – The Lion Guard
 Kerry Washington – Cars 3

Music

Outstanding New Artist
 SZA – Ctrl
 Demetria McKinney – Officially Yours
 Khalid – American Teen
 Kevin Ross – The Awakening
 Vic Mensa – The Autobiography

Outstanding Male Artist
 Bruno Mars – "Versace on the Floor"
 JAY-Z – 4:44
 Kendrick Lamar – DAMN.
 Brian McKnight – Genesis
 Charlie Wilson – In It to Win It

Outstanding Female Artist
 Mary J. Blige – Strength of a Woman
 Beyoncé – "Die with You"
 Andra Day – "Stand Up For Something"
 Ledisi – Let Love Rule
 SZA – Ctrl

Outstanding Duo, Group or Collaboration
 Kendrick Lamar feat. Rihanna – "LOYALTY."
 Mary J. Blige feat. Kanye West – "Love Yourself"
 Andra Day feat. Common – "Stand Up For Something"
 SZA feat. Travis Scott – "Love Galore"
 Charlie Wilson feat. T.I. – "I'm Blessed"

Outstanding Jazz Album
 Somi – Petite Afrique
 Damien Escobar – Boundless
 Najee – Poetry in Motion
 Cécile McLorin Salvant – Dreams and Daggers
 Preservation Hall Jazz Band – So It Is

Outstanding Gospel Album – Traditional or Contemporary
 Greenleaf Soundtrack – Greenleaf Soundtrack Volume 2
 Tasha Cobbs – Heart. Passion. Pursuit.
 Travis Greene – Crossover Live From Music City
 Marvin Sapp – Close
 CeCe Winans – Let Them Fall In Love

Outstanding Music Video
 Bruno Mars – "That's What I Like"
 Mary J. Blige – "Strength of a Woman"
 JAY-Z – "4:44"
 Maxwell – "Gods"
 Ledisi – "High"

Outstanding Song, Traditional
 Bruno Mars – "That's What I Like"
 Mary J. Blige – "U + Me (Love Lesson)"
 Ledisi – "High"
 John Legend – "Surefire (Piano Version)"
 MAJOR. – "Honest"

Outstanding Song, Contemporary
 Kendrick Lamar – "HUMBLE."
 JAY-Z – "The Story of O.J."
 Mali Music – "Gonna Be Alright"
 Jazmine Sullivan x Bryson Tiller – "Insecure"
 SZA feat. Travis Scott – "Love Galore"

Outstanding Album
 Kendrick Lamar – DAMN.
 Mary J. Blige – Strength of a Woman
 JAY-Z – 4:44
 Brian McKnight – Genesis
 Charlie Wilson – In It to Win It

Literature

Outstanding Literary Work, Fiction
 Henry Louis Gates Jr. and Maria Tatar – The Annotated African American Folktales
 Marita Golden – The Wide Circumference of Love
 Celeste Ng – Little Fires Everywhere
 Jesmyn Ward – Sing, Unburied, Sing
 Stephanie Powell Watts – No One Is Coming to Save Us

Outstanding Literary Work, Non-Fiction
 Dick Gregory – Defining Moments in Black History: Reading Between the Lies
 Herb Boyd – Black Detroit – A People’s History of Self-Determination
 Paul Butler – Chokehold: Policing Black Men
 Ta-Nehisi Coates – We Were Eight Years in Power: An American Tragedy
 Adrian Miller – The President's Kitchen Cabinet: The Story of the African Americans Who Have Fed Our First Families, from the Washingtons to the Obamas

Outstanding Literary Work, Debut Author
 Stephanie Powell Watts – No One Is Coming to Save Us
 Devin Allen – A Beautiful Ghetto
 Leland Melvin – Chasing Spaces: An Astronaut’s Story of Grit, Grace & Second Chances
 Gabrielle Union – We're Going to Need More Wine
 Patricia Williams with Jeannine Amber – Rabbit: The Autobiography of Ms. Pat

Outstanding Literary Work, Biography/Auto-Biography
 Susan Burton and Cari Lynn – Becoming Ms. Burton - From Prison to Recovery to Leading the Fight for Incarcerated Women
 Peter Baker – Obama: The Call of History
 Jonathan Eig – Ali: A Life
 Lawrence P. Jackson – Chester B. Himes
 Gabrielle Union – We're Going to Need More Wine

Outstanding Literary Work, Instructional
 Tererai Trent – The Awakened Woman: Remembering & Reigniting Our Sacred Dreams
Misty Copeland – Ballerina Body: Dancing and Eating Your Way to a Leaner, Stronger, and More Graceful You
 Kelvin Davis – Notoriously Dapper - How to Be A Modern Gentleman with Manners, Style and Body Confidence
 Kristen Kish with Meredith Erickson – Kristen Kish Cooking
 Sheri Riley – Exponential Living - Stop Spending 100% of Your Time on 10% of Who You Are

Outstanding Literary Work, Poetry
 Patricia Smith – Incendiary Art: Poems
 Cameron Barnett – The Drowning Boy's Guide to Water
 Aja Monet – My Mother Was a Freedom Fighter
 Ntozake Shange – Wild Beauty: New and Selected Poems
 Marcus Wicker – Silencer

Outstanding Literary Work, Children
 Vashti Harrison – Little Leaders: Bold Women in Black History
 Kareem Abdul-Jabbar with Raymond Obstfeld – Becoming Kareem: Growing Up On and Off the Court
 Lesa Cline-Ransome and James E. Ransome  – Before She Was Harriet
 Andrea J. Loney and Keith Mallett – Take a Picture of Me, James VanDerZee!
 Cynthia Levinson and Vanessa Brantley-Newton – The Youngest Marcher: The Story of Audrey Faye Hendricks, A Young Civil Rights Activist

Outstanding Literary Work, Youth/Teens
 Rita Williams-Garcia and Frank Morrison – Clayton Byrd Goes Underground
 Kwame Alexander with Mary Rand Hess – Solo
 Tiffany D. Jackson – Allegedly
 Jason Reynolds - Long Way Down
 Angie Thomas – The Hate U Give

References

External links
 NAACP Image Awards official site

NAACP Image Awards
N
N
N
NAACP Image